Thelma Glass (May 16, 1916 – July 24, 2012) was an American civil rights activist, noted for helping to organize the Montgomery bus boycott of 1955, and a professor of geography.

Biography
Glass was born Thelma McWilliams in Mobile, Alabama, to a hotel cook and homemaker. She graduated from Dunbar High School (Mobile) and attended Alabama State University and Columbia University.

In 1955, after Rosa Parks' arrest, Glass and the other members of the Women's Political Council, called for a boycott of the Montgomery bus system, thus beginning the Montgomery bus boycott, a key action in the Civil Rights Movement. Glass had joined the organization in 1947 and in 1955 was its secretary.  The Rev. Dr. Martin Luther King Jr. joined in the protests as well and worked with her.  She passed out fliers, alerted the community, and urged passengers to walk or car-pool.  Soon she noticed every bus that went by was empty of passengers.  Although there was sometimes violent retaliation, the boycott continued and eventually the Supreme Court ruled that segregation on buses was unconstitutional and the boycott ended.

She married Arthur Glass in 1942, and both taught geography at Alabama State University, where her husband was also a professor. Glass died in 2012 at the age of 96.

References

Further reading
 Adam Bernstein, "Thelma Glass, Alabama teacher at the forefront of civil rights activism, dies at 96", Washington Post, July 26, 2012.

External links
 Obituary, Montgomery Advertiser
 "Remembering Civil Rights Pioneer Thelma Glass", WSFA (news video)

1916 births
2012 deaths
African-American academics
American geographers
Women civil rights activists
Activists for African-American civil rights
History of civil rights in the United States
Alabama State University faculty
Alabama State University alumni
Columbia University alumni
People from Mobile, Alabama
Activists from Alabama
20th-century African-American people
21st-century African-American people